The 2009 Coupe de France Final was the 91st final of France's most prestigious cup competition, the Coupe de France. The final was played at the Stade de France in the Paris suburb of Saint-Denis on 9 May 2009 and was contested between Rennes of Ligue 1 and Guingamp of Ligue 2. Guingamp earned its first Coupe de France trophy after defeating Rennes 2–1 through two second-half goals from Eduardo.

Background
This was Rennes' fifth appearance in the final, having won the cup in 1965 and 1971, and finishing as runners-up in 1922 and 1935. It was Rennes' first final playing under its new emblem and name having achieved the previous honours under the Université Club emblem. This was Guingamp's second appearance in the final, having previously appeared in the 1997 final, losing to Nice on penalties.

This was the first final since 1956 in which both finalists were based in the same region of France, Brittany.

Rennes was designated as the home team and wore their original red and black kit. Due to Guingamp having similar colours, both for home and away, they turned out in an all-white kit for the final.

Route to the final

Match report
The first half of the 91st final of the Coupe de France was relatively equal early on, but it was Guingamp who attacked early on, with striker Eduardo forcing a fingertip save from Nicolas Douchez after he dislodged defender Rod Fanni in the 12th minute. This was followed up by a long-range chance from midfielder Lionel Mathis, which sailed wide left. Rennes was primarily held to taking long-range shots, however Moussa Sow tested Guillaume Gauclin in the 23rd minute, producing a shot which went just wide. The best chance of the first half would come for Guingamp in the 31st minute when Wilson Oruma' cross into the box found an un-marked Richard Soumah, who forced a tremendous save from Douchez. Rennes responded in the 40th minute with Jérôme Leroy taking an unexpected shot from nearly 30 metres from goal; the shot went past goalkeeper Gauclin, but struck the post going out of play.

The second half began with a quick attack from Rennes. Capitalizing on a Guingamp turnover, Rennes started a counterattack led by Moussa Sow. Their chance, taken by Leroy, was shot straight at the Guingamp goalkeeper. In the 53rd minute, Rennes almost scored the first goal of the match again when Leroy found Sow. For the second time in the match, however, the shot from Sow hit the post after beating the goalkeeper. Leroy and Sow would be involved in another chance again from Rennes in the 65th minute: after a cross into the box, Sow attempted an overhead kick, but instead knocked the ball into the air and into the path of Leroy, who again blew a chance, sending the ball into the stands despite being about ten metres from goal. Rennes would finally score goal, following a free-kick into the box. The ball travelled passed everyone save for Carlos Bocanegra, who headed the ball past Gauclin to give Rennes a 1–0 lead. Within minutes, however, Guingamp would respond: following a Felipe Saad cross into the box, the ball landed at the feet of Petter Hansson who inadvertently redirected it into the path of Eduardo, who converted to even the match at 1–1. Ten minutes later, Eduardo would strike again when, after a scramble in the box, he found the ball at his feet and proceeded to take a driven, right-footed shot which ran under Douchez to give the Ligue 2 side a 2–1 lead. The goal eventually turned out to be the winner, giving the second division side its first ever Coupe de France title. Guingamp's victory also earned the club an appearance in the 2009–10 UEFA Europa League.

Match details

See also
Derby Breton

References

External links
 Coupe de France Results

Coupe
2009
Coupe De France Final 2009
Coupe De France Final 2009
Coupe de France Final
Sport in Saint-Denis, Seine-Saint-Denis
Coupe de France Final